Abdurraman Fangaj (born 12 October 1997) is an Albanian professional footballer who plays for Albanian Superliga club KF Vllaznia Shkodër. He is primarily a right-back, but can also play as a centre-back.

Club career

Early career
Fangaj started his youth career at the age of 14 with Vllaznia Shkodër. During the 2011–12 season he played with Vllaznia Shkodër under-16 side. Then he moved on loan to Tërbuni Pukë under-19 for the entire 2012–13 season. He returned to Vllaznia Shkodër in 2013 where he played for the under-19 side, before he became professional at age of 18 when he was called up to the first team by coach Armir Grimaj for the 2015–16 Albanian Cup match against Apolonia Fier on 28 October 2015. He was unused substitute for the entire match.

Tërbuni Pukë
In January 2016 he was loaned out one more time to Tërbuni Pukë until the end of the 2015–16 season. He was an unused substitute in his first match for Tërbuni Pukë on 6 February 2016 against Bylis Ballsh before making his debut one week later against Skënderbeu Korçë playing the full 90-minutes match in a 1–3 loss.

International career
He was invited at Albania national under-19 football team for the 2016 UEFA European Under-19 Championship qualification from 12–17 November 2015 by coach Arjan Bellaj but he didn't manage to participate in any match.

Career statistics

Club

References

External links

Abdurraman Fangaj profile FSHF.org

1997 births
Living people
Footballers from Shkodër
Albanian footballers
Albania youth international footballers
Association football defenders
KF Tërbuni Pukë players
KF Laçi players
KF Vllaznia Shkodër players
Kategoria Superiore players